This is a list of singer-songwriters who write, compose, and perform their own musical material. The list is divided into two sections to differentiate between artists categorized as singer-songwriters and others who do not fall under the definition associated with the genre:
 Traditional singer-songwriters 
 Others who both write songs and sing

Traditional singer-songwriters
This list enumerates people who record and perform in the traditional singer-songwriter approach. These performers write their own material, accompany themselves on guitar or keyboards, usually perform solo or with limited and understated accompaniment, and are known as much for their songwriting skills as for their performance abilities.

This list includes both living and deceased singer-songwriters.

Argentina

 Lisandro Abadie
 Miguel Abuelo
 Carlos Acuña
 King África
 Oscar Alemán
 Marcelo Álvarez
 Benjamin Amadeo
 Mike Amigorena
 Lisandro Aristimuño
 Federico Aubele
 Axel
 Pedro Aznar
 Bahiano
 Juan Carlos Baglietto
 Abel Balbo
 Adrián Barilari
 Dimi Bass
 Daniela Anahi Bessia
 Claudio Basso
 Alfredo Belusi
 Patricio Borghetti
 Germán Burgos
 Manuel Buzón
 Facundo Cabral
 Jorge Cafrune
 Andrés Calamaro
 Carlos Casella
 Gustavo Cerati
 Tito Climent
 Alberto Cortez
 Sandro de América
 Carlos De Antonis
 Jimena Fama
 Dora Gález
 Charly García
 Carlos Gardel
 León Gieco
 Gilda
 Horacio Guarany
 Gloria Guzmán
 Víctor Heredia
 Alejandro Lerner
 Luisana Lopilato
 Valeria Lynch
 Juanita Martínez
 :es:Lucas Masciano
 Emilia Mernes
 Sandra Mihanovich
 Amelia Mirel
 Ricardo Mollo
 Lely Morel
 Marcela Morelo
 Adrián Otero
 Fito Páez
 Soledad Pastorutti
 Luciano Pereyra
 Abel Pintos
 Luciana Salazar
 Noel Schajris
 Patricia Sosa
 Luis Alberto Spinetta
 Martina Stoessel
 Tanguito
 Diego Torres
 Bren Vaneske
 María Elena Walsh
 Atahualpa Yupanqui
 Miguel Zavaleta

Australia

 Peter Allen
 Tina Arena
 Jimmy Barnes
 Sarah Blasko
 Eric Bogle
 Daryl Braithwaite
 Rose Bygrave
 Kev Carmody
 Cletis Carr
 Nick Cave
 Ned Collette
 Ricki-Lee Coulter
 Paul Dempsey
 Johnny Diesel
 Joe Dolce
 Slim Dusty
 Bernard Fanning
 John Farnham
 Bobby Flynn
 Robert Forster
 Tim Freedman
 Corinne Gibbons
 Delta Goodrem
 Darren Hayes
 Missy Higgins
 Jarryd James
 Paul Kelly
 Ben Lee
 Dean Lewis
 Lior
 Alex Lloyd
 Robyn Loau
 Jessica Mauboy
 David McComb
 Hugh McDonald
 Andrea McEwan
 Grant McLennan
 Lisa Miller
 Kate Miller-Heidke
 Tim Minchin
 Lisa Mitchell
 Benjamin Grant Mitchell
 Pete Murray
 Olivia Newton-John
 Kevin Parker
 Paulini
 Josh Pyke
 James Reyne
 Tim Rogers
 Xavier Rudd
 Saritah
 Guy Sebastian
 Mark Seymour
 Sia
 Troye Sivan
 Rob Swire
 Billy Thorpe
 Holly Throsby
 Megan Washington
 Darlene Zschech

Austria

 Wolfgang Ambros
 Peter Cornelius
 Georg Danzer
 Rainhard Fendrich
 Sissy Handler
 André Heller
 Michael Heltau
 Udo Jürgens
 Anja Plaschg
 Willi Resetarits

Barbados

Alison Hinds
Rihanna
Rupee
Shontelle

Belgium

 Sarah Bettens
 Jacques Brel
 Ozark Henry
 Lara Fabian
Flip Kowlier
 Milow
 Selah Sue
 Stromae

Bosnia and Hercegovina
 Kemal Monteno

Brazil

 Almir Sater
 Jorge Ben Jor
 Maria Bethânia
 Fernanda Brum
 Chico Buarque
 Alice Caymmi
 Roberto Carlos
 Fagner
 Ludmila Ferber
 Paula Fernandes
 Gilberto Gil
 João Gilberto
 Antônio Carlos Jobim
 Tom Jobim
 Vinicius de Moraes
 Ana Nóbrega
 Zé Ramalho
 Gabriela Rocha
 Angela Ro Ro
 Israel Salazar
 Sandra de Sá
 Sandy
 Luan Santana
 Nívea Soares
 Juliano Son
 Ana Paula Valadão
 André Valadão
 Mariana Valadão
 Caetano Veloso
 Xuxa
 Anitta
 Daniela Mercury

Cambodia

Pan Ron
Ros Serey Sothea
Sinn Sisamouth

Canada

A–J

Bryan Adams
Susan Aglukark
Paul Anka
Jann Arden
Tenille Arts
Tal Bachman
Jugpreet Singh Bajwa
Victoria Banks
Jill Barber
Daniel Bélanger
Willie P. Bennett
Moe Berg
Art Bergmann
Justin Bieber
Bif Naked
David Bradstreet
Dean Brody
Jon Brooks
Jim Bryson
Michael Bublé
Basia Bulat
Meryn Cadell
Alessia Cara
Craig Cardiff
Andrew Cash
Alanna Clarke
Tom Cochrane
Bruce Cockburn
Leonard Cohen
Holly Cole
Jason Collett
Stompin' Tom Connors
J.P. Cormier
Rose Cousins
Allison Crowe
Lori Cullen
Amelia Curran
Rick Danko
Mac Demarco
Melanie Doane
Bonnie Dobson
Fefe Dobson
Julie Doiron
Luke Doucet
Alan Doyle
Damhnait Doyle
Drake
Fred Eaglesmith
Kathleen Edwards
Lara Fabian
Stephen Fearing
Feist
Christine Fellows
Ferron
Jeremy Fisher
David Francey
Nelly Furtado
Garou
Joel Gibb
Ariana Gillis
Christian Kit Goguen
Matthew Good
Sebastien Grainger
Jenn Grant
Dallas Green
Jack Grunsky
Emm Gryner
Emily Haines
Sarah Harmer
Hayden
Rob Heath
Dan Hill
Veda Hille
Terry Jacks
Colin James
Carly Rae Jepsen
Steve Jocz
Brad Johner
Alexz Johnson
Sass Jordan

L–Z

 Connie Kaldor
 James Keelaghan
 Chantal Kreviazuk
 k.d. lang
 Plume Latraverse
 Lisa Lavie
 Avril Lavigne
 Daniel Lavoie
 Félix Leclerc
 Jean Leloup
 Gordon Lightfoot
 Lights
 Corb Lund
 Tara MacLean
 Catherine MacLellan
 Dan Mangan
 Richard Manuel
 Amanda Marshall
 Melissa McClelland
 Eileen McGann
 Kate & Anna McGarrigle
 Loreena McKennitt
 Sarah McLachlan
 Holly McNarland
 Shawn Mendes
 Lynn Miles
 Amy Millan
 Joni Mitchell
 Ruth Moody
 Alanis Morissette
 Jess Moskaluke
 Emilie Mover
 Sierra Noble
 Mary Margaret O'Hara
 Old Man Luedecke
 Maren Ord
 Blair Packham
 Chris Patrick
 Carole Pope
 Powfu
 Jan Randall
 Jimmy Rankin
 Michel Rivard
 Sam Roberts
 Garnet Rogers
 Stan Rogers
 Louis Royer
 Buffy Sainte-Marie
 John K. Samson
 Drew Seeley
 Lorraine Segato
 Jay Semko
 Ron Sexsmith
 Jane Siberry
 R. Dean Taylor
 Tegan and Sara
 Tenille Townes
 Shania Twain
 Ian Tyson
 Sylvia Tyson
 Martha Wainwright
 Rufus Wainwright
 Patrick Watson
 The Weeknd
 David Wiffen
 Hawksley Workman
 Neil Young
 Brigitte Zarie
 Joel Zifkin

Chile

 Beto Cuevas
 Daniel Puente Encina
 Gepe
 Víctor Jara
 Javiera Mena
 Ángel Parra
 Javiera Parra
 Violeta Parra

Colombia

 Alci Acosta
 Albalucía Ángel
 Lucas Arnau
 J Balvin
 Blessd
 Naty Botero
 Cabas
 Alex Campos
 Jorge Celedón
 Andrés Cepeda
 ChocQuibTown
 Silvestre Dangond
 Margarita Rosa de Francisco
 Diomedes Díaz
 Alejo Durán
 Andrea Echeverri
 Juan Carlos Echeverry
 Estéfano
 Fonseca
 Darío Gómez
 Marta Gómez
 Leonor Gonzalez Mina
 Ivonne Guzmán
 Illona
 Juanes
 Totó la Momposina
 Carolina la O
 Fanny Lú
 Maía
 Maluma
 Marbelle
 Marce
 Andrés Mercado
 Ericson Alexander Molano
 Jorge Oñate
 Elkin Ramírez
 Valentina Rendón
 Reykon
 Jery Sandoval
 Shakira
 Soraya
 Ali Stone
 Andrés Useche
 Jorge Villamizar
 Iván Villazón
 Carlos Vives
 Charlie Zaa
 Emiliano Zuleta

Croatia

Arsen Dedić
Oliver Dragojević

Cuba

Albita
Giselle Bellas
Camila Cabello
Osmani García
Pablo Milanés
Silvio Rodríguez

Czech Republic

 Jaroslav Hutka
 Tomáš Klus
 Karel Kryl
 Vladimír Merta
 Jaromír Nohavica
 Karel Plíhal
 Vlastimil Třešňák
 Xindl X
 Markéta Irglová

Denmark

 Steffen Brandt
 Tina Dico
 Michael Falch
 Claus Hempler
 Christian Hjelm
 Søren Huss
 C. V. Jørgensen
 Juncker
 Marie Key
 Poul Krebs
 Nanna Lüders Jensen
 Mads Langer
 Kim Larsen
 Lars Lilholt
 Anne Linnet
 Johnny Madsen
 Anne Dorte Michelsen
 Rasmus Nøhr
 Allan Olsen
 Naja Rosa
 Soluna Samay
 Sebastian
 Rasmus Seebach
 Tommy Seebach
 Niels Skousen
 Peter Sommer

Dominican Republic

Anaís
Charytín
Juan Luis Guerra
Sandra Zaiter
Santaye

Egypt

 Moustafa Amar
 Angham
 Amr Diab
 Mohammad Fouad
 Mohamed Hamaki
 Tamer Hosny
 Amal Maher
 Hani Shaker
 Sherine
 Carmen Suleiman

El Salvador
 Álvaro Torres

Faroe Islands

 Eivør
 Guðrið Hansdóttir
 Teitur Lassen

Finland

 Ismo Alanko
 Chisu
 Jippu
 J. Karjalainen
 Anssi Kela
 Mikko Kuustonen
 Juice Leskinen
 Jarkko Martikainen
 Jonna Tervomaa
 Maija Vilkkumaa

France

 Dominique A
 Charles Aznavour
 Barbara
 Georges Brassens
 Carla Bruni
 Francis Cabrel
 Camille
 Louis Chedid
 Yves Duteil
 Mylène Farmer
 Jean Ferrat
 Léo Ferré
 Nino Ferrer
 Thomas Fersen
 Serge Gainsbourg
 Jean-Jacques Goldman
 Jacques Higelin
 Alexis HK
 Juliette
 Bernard Lavilliers
 Robert Lelièvre
 Nolwenn Leroy
 Albert Marcœur
 Nina Morato
 Georges Moustaki
 Claude Nougaro
 Pierre Perret
 Michel Polnareff
 Renaud
 Véronique Sanson
 Mano Solo
 Alain Souchon
 Hubert-Félix Thiéfaine 
 Boris Vian
 Laurent Voulzy 
 Indila 
 Willy William

Georgia
Katie Melua

Germany

 Ayọ
 Wolf Biermann
 Clemens Bittlinger
 Clueso
 Funny van Dannen
 Franz Josef Degenhardt
Kurt Demmler
 Dota
 Siegfried Fietz
 Rob Georg
 Herbert Grönemeyer
 Klaus Hoffmann
 Hanns Dieter Hüsch
 Gisbert zu Knyphausen
 Udo Lindenberg
 Peter Maffay
 Reinhard Mey
 Marius Müller-Westernhagen
 Astrid North
 Markus Rill
 Martin Gotthard Schneider
 Olli Schulz
 Manfred Siebald
 Hannes Wader
 Konstantin Wecker
 Johanna Zeul
 Joana Zimmer

Greece

 Haris Alexiou
 Andriana Babali
 George Dalaras
 Michalis Hatzigiannis
 Lavrentis Machairitsas
 Vasilis Papakonstantinou
 Demis Roussos

Guatemala

 Ricardo Arjona
 Gaby Moreno
 Shery

Iceland

 Ólöf Arnalds
 Ásgeir Trausti
 Björk
 Jónsi
 Lay Low
 Megas
 Emilíana Torrini
 Svavar Knútur
 Jófríður Ákadóttir

India

 AP Dhillon
 Gurinder Gill
 Kaka (Punjabi singer)
 Amrit Maan
 Talat Aziz 
 Badshah
 Jugpreet Singh Bajwa
 S. P. Balasubrahmanyam
 Rekha Bhardwaj
 Vishal Bhardwaj
 Dilpreet Bhatia
 Asha Bhonsle
 Sunidhi Chauhan
 Alisha Chinai
 Vishal Dadlani
 Manna Dey
 Zubeen Garg
 Gur Sidhu
 Jassa Dhillon
 Shreya Ghoshal
 Gippy Grewal
 Hariharan
 Ilaiyaraaja
 Mahalaxmi Iyer
 Neha Kakkar
 Suman Kalyanpur
 Hard Kaur
 Harshdeep Kaur
 Kishor Kumar
 Babbu Maan
 Shankar Mahadevan
 Armaan Malik
 Anushka Manchanda
 Lata Mangeshkar
 Talat Mehmood
 Salim Merchant
 Palak Muchhal
 Mukesh
 Udit Narayan
 Sonu Nigam
 Damodar Raao
 Mohammad Rafi
 A. R. Rahman
 Tochi Raina
 Guru Randhawa
 Anirudh Ravichander
 Himesh Reshammiya
 Anupam Roy
 Kumar Sanu
 Shaan
 Arijit Singh
 Honey Singh
 Jagjit Singh
 Sukhwinder Singh
 Kavita Subramaniam
 Pankaj Udhas
 Usha Uthup
 Suresh Wadkar
 Alka Yagnik
 K. J. Yesudas
 Sidhu Moose Wala
 Jass Manak

Indonesia

 Ebiet G Ade
 Maudy Ayunda
 Iwan Fals
 Fariz RM
 Melly Goeslaw
 Gombloh
 Rhoma Irama
 Harry Roesli
 Sandhy Sondoro
 Yockie Suryoprayogo

Iran

 Shadmehr Aghili
 Faramarz Aslani
 Mohammad Esfahani
 Shahyar Ghanbari
 Hichkas
 Shahram Nazeri
 Mohammad Reza Shajarian
 Siavash Ghomayshi
 Reza Yazdani
 Mohsen Yeganeh

Ireland

 Luka Bloom
 Bono
 Paul Brady
 Paddy Casey
 Mic Christopher
 Andrea Corr
 Sharon Corr
 Damien Dempsey
 Janet Devlin
 EDEN
 Mick Flannery
 Dave Flynn
 Mark Geary
 Lisa Hannigan
 Glen Hansard
 Frank Harte
 Gemma Hayes
 Margaret Healy
 Christie Hennessy
 David Hopkins
 Niall Horan
 Hozier
 Andy Irvine
 Katie Kim
 Vyvienne Long
 Phil Lynott
 Shane MacGowan
 James Vincent McMorrow
 Christy Moore
 Van Morrison
 Johnny Moynihan
 Mundy
Maura O'Connell
 Sinéad O'Connor
 Ted O'Neill
 Declan O'Rourke
 Fionn Regan
 Damien Rice
 Ann Scott
 Chris Singleton
 Andy White

Israel

 Chava Alberstein
 Meir Ariel
 Shlomo Artzi
 Izhar Ashdot
 Ehud Banai
 David Broza
 Matti Caspi
 Ilan Chester
 Arik Einstein
 Aviv Geffen
 Shlomo Gronich
 Shalom Hanoch
 Achinoam Nini
 Idan Raichel
 Naomi Shemer
 Ariel Zilber

Italy

 Alice
 Biagio Antonacci
 Claudio Baglioni
 Franco Battiato
 Lucio Battisti
 Edoardo Bennato
 Samuele Bersani
 Andrea Bocelli
 Angelo Branduardi
 Marianna Cataldi
 Adriano Celentano
 Chiara Civello
 Riccardo Cocciante
 Carmen Consoli
 Cesare Cremonini
 Lucio Dalla
 Pino Daniele
 Fabrizio De André
 Francesco De Gregori
 Dolcenera
 Elisa
 Sergio Endrigo
 Gabriella Ferri
 Tiziano Ferro
 Zucchero Fornaciari
 Ivano Fossati
 Giorgio Gaber
 Francesco Guccini
 Jovanotti
 Luciano Ligabue
 Nada
 Gianna Nannini
 Mia Martini
 Domenico Modugno
 Gianni Morandi
 Gino Paoli
 Laura Pausini
 Rita Pavone
 Eros Ramazzotti
 Stefano Righi
 Vasco Rossi
 Luigi Tenco
 Roberto Vecchioni
 Antonello Venditti

Jamaica

 Alaine
 Buju Banton
 Pato Banton
 Burning Spear
 Jimmy Cliff
 Beres Hammond
 Toots Hibbert
 Barrington Levy
 Bob Marley
 Damian Marley
 Rita Marley
 Skip Marley
 Stephen Marley
 Ziggy Marley
 Sizzla

Lebanon

 Joseph Attieh
 David M. Bailey
 Lydia Canaan
 IJK

Lithuania 

 Vytautas Kernagis

Malaysia 

 Sudirman Arshad
 Zee Avi
 Vince Chong
 M. Nasir
 P. Ramlee
 Shanon Shah
 Pete Teo
 Yuna
 Azmyl Yunor
 Meor Aziddin Yusof
 Alyah

Malta
 Walter Micallef

Mexico

 Roberto Cantoral
 Óscar Chávez
 Lolita de la Colina
 Fernando Delgadillo
 Emmanuel
 Rubén Fuentes
 Ana Gabriel
 Juan Gabriel
 María Grever
 Saúl Hernández
 José Alfredo Jiménez
 Agustín Lara
 Armando Manzanero
 Carla Morrison
 Sofía Reyes
 Cuco Sánchez
 Joan Sebastian
 Marco Antonio Solís
 Aleks Syntek
 Lynda Thomas
 Consuelo Velázquez
 Julieta Venegas

Moldova
 Dan Balan
 Pavel Stratan

Netherlands

 Stevie Ann
 Frank Boeijen
 Anneke van Giersbergen
 Marike Jager
 Laura Jansen
 Loona
 Lucky Fonz III
 Nielson
 Ntjam Rosie
 Ede Staal
 Jack Jersey
 Guus Meeuwis
 Anouk Teeuwe
 Herman van Veen
 Robert Westerholt

New Zealand

Aaradhna
Megan Alatini
Daniel Bedingfield
Carly Binding
Jackie Clarke
Ashely Cooper
Joe Cotton
Annie Crummer
Martin Curtis
Lynette Diaz
Dave Dobbyn
Liam Finn
Neil Finn
Tim Finn
Brooke Fraser
Che Fu
Rob Guest
Luke Hurley
Greg Johnson
Phil Judd
David Kilgour
Nathan King
Ladyhawke
Shona Laing
Lorde
Ben Lummis
Jamie McDell
Fiona McDonald
Anika Moa
Howard Morrison
Tex Morton
John Rowles
Bic Runga
Boh Runga
Hollie Smith
Frankie Stevens
Tiki Taane
Marcus Turner
Keith Urban
Rosita Vai
Hayley Westenra
Annie Whittle

Nigeria

 Jahdiel
 Malcolm Guite
 Muma Gee
 Nneka
 Onyeka Onwenu
 Omawumi
 Tiwa Savage

Norway

 Aurora Aksnes
 Julie Bergan
 Kari Bremnes
 Ane Brun
 Thomas Dybdahl
 Torgunn Flaten
 Magne Furuholmen
 Christine Guldbrandsen
 Morten Harket
 Monica Heldal
 Thom Hell
 William Hut
 Alexandra Joner
 Sissel Kyrkjebø
 Marit Larsen
 Sondre Lerche
 Espen Lind
 Magnet (born Even Johansen)
 Marcus & Martinus (American singers)
 Lene Marlin
 Maria Mena
 Moddi
 Silje Nergaard
 Lillebjørn Nilsen
 Siri Nilsen
 Janove Ottesen
 Robert Post
 Marion Ravn
 Kari Rueslåtten
 Astrid S
 Iselin Solheim
 Susanne Sundfør
 Paul Waaktaar-Savoy
 Vegard Ylvisåker
 Bertine Zetlitz

Panama

 Joey Montana

Peru

 Chabuca Granda
 Gian Marco
 Pedro Suarez Vertiz

Philippines

 Nilo Alcala
 Ogie Alcasid
 Jose Mari Chan
 Sharon Cuneta
 Glaiza de Castro
 Rodel Naval
 Robin Nievera
 Nityalila
 Rico J. Puno
 Max Surban
 Rey Valera
 Yoyoy Villame

Poland

 Edyta Bartosiewicz
Edyta Górniak
 Katy Carr
 Jacek Kaczmarski
Kasia Moś

Portugal

 Zeca Afonso
 Leonor Andrade
 Tiago Bettencourt
 David Carreira
 Mickael Carreira
 Fernando Daniel
 Carolina Deslandes
 Sérgio Godinho
 David Fonseca
 Rita Guerra
 Mariza
 Ana Moura
 Adriano Correia de Oliveira
 Jorge Palma
 Diogo Piçarra
 Mia Rose
 José Carlos Ary dos Santos
 Paulo Sousa
 JP Simões
 Raquel Tavares
 Fernando Tordo
 Vitorino
 António Zambujo

Puerto Rico

 Zayra Alvarez
 Tito Auger
 Puchi Balseiro
 Obie Bermúdez
 Americo Boschetti
 Lou Briel
 Roy Brown
 Antonio Cabán Vale
 Nano Cabrera
 Bobby Capó
 Vicente Carattini
 Santos Colón
 Elvis Crespo
 Tony Croatto
 Bobby Cruz
 Tite Curet Alonso
 Johnathan Dwayne
 Rafi Escudero
 Noel Estrada
 Farruko
 José Feliciano
 Luis Fonsi
 Kany García
 Gustavo Laureano
 Héctor Lavoe
 Ricky Martin
 Yolandita Monge
 Glenn Monroig
 Ednita Nazario
 Noelia
 José Nogueras
 Don Omar
 Angel "Cuco" Peña
 Ignacio Peña
 Carlos Ponce
 Sylvia Rexach
 Julito Rodríguez
 Dräco Rosa
 Zoraida Santiago
 Myrta Silva
 Olga Tañón
 Tommy Torres
 Juan Vélez
 Wilkins Vélez
 Yaire
 Daddy Yankee
 Zeny & Zory

Romania
 
 Akcent 
 Andreea Banica 
 Alexandra Stan
 Antonia Iacobescu 
 Inna 
 3 Sud Est 
 DJ Project 
 Deepcentral 
 Delia Matache 
 Morandi 
 Marius Moga 
 Edward Maya 
 Lora

Russia

 Veronika Dolina
 Yanka Dyagileva
 Alexander Gorodnitsky
 Lena Katina
 Eduard Khil
 Andrei Makarevich
 Sergey Nikitin
 Bulat Okudzhava
 Viktor Tsoi
 Yuri Vizbor
 Vladimir Vysotsky

Slovakia

 Celeste Buckingham
 Marika Gombitová
 Vašo Patejdl
 Dara Rolins
 Dežo Ursiny

South Africa

 Koos du Plessis
 Jennifer Ferguson
 Anton Goosen
 Sonja Herholdt
 Lira (singer)
 Steve Kekana
 Jim Neversink
 Karen Zoid

Spain

 Manuel Alejandro
 Pablo Alborán
 Luis Eduardo Aute
 María del Mar Bonet
 Miguel Bosé
 Nino Bravo
 Diego El Cigala
 Els Setze Jutges
 Manolo Garcia
 Paco Ibañez
 Enrique Iglesias
 Julio Iglesias
 Lluís Llach
 Victor Manuel
 Roger Mas
 Antonio Orozco
 Tomeu Penya
 José Luis Perales
 Porta
 Raimon
 Joaquín Sabina
 Joan Manuel Serrat
 Camilo Sesto
 Jaume Sisa
 Álex Ubago

Sri Lanka

 Desmond Kelly
 Nimal Mendis
 Clarence Wijewardena

Sweden

 
 PewDiePie
 Joel Berghult
 Basshunter 
 Tommy Blom
 Mikael Åkerfeldt
 Fred Åkerström
 Ulla Andersson
 Tomas Andersson Wij
 AronChupa
 Kristofer Åström
 Thomas Di Leva
 Nicolai Dunger
 Marie Fredriksson
 Per Gessle
 José González
 Nanne Grönvall
 Håkan Hellström
 Tommy Karevik
 Christian Kjellvander
 Laleh
 Jens Lekman
 Göran Lagerberg
 Danne Larsson
 Zara Larsson
 Lykke Li
 Lisa Miskovsky
 Linn Berggren
 Stina Nordenstam
 Povel Ramel
 Robyn
 Ilya Salmanzadeh
 Stefan Sundström
 Evert Taube
 Isa Tengblad
 Anna Ternheim
 Joakim Thåström
 Cornelis Vreeswijk
 Lars Winnerbäck
 Sophie Zelmani

Switzerland

 Bastian Baker
 David Buzzi
 Simone Drexel
 Mélanie René

United Kingdom

A–L

Adele
Lily Allen
Ian Anderson
Harvey Andrews
Gabrielle Aplin
Lauren Aquilina
Joan Armatrading
Rick Astley
Kevin Ayers
Gary Barlow
Syd Barrett
Rich Batsford
James Bay
Peter Bellamy
Belouis Some
Matt Bigland
James Blunt
David Bowie
Robbie Boyd
Mike Batt
Billy Bragg
Sarah Brightman
Andy Brown
Melanie Brown
Kate Bush
Euros Childs
Melanie C
Eric Clapton
Dodie Clark
Gary Clark
Lloyd Cole
JP Cooper
Jessica Cornish
Elvis Costello
Barns Courtney
Beverley Craven
Charlotte Gordon Cumming
Stanley J. Damerell
Paul Stuart Davies
Ray Davies
Alex Day
Sandy Denny
Chris de Burgh
Lynsey de Paul
Marina Diamandis
Dido
Siobhán Donaghy
Donovan
Josh Doyle
Nick Drake
Duffy
Ian Dury
Perrie Edwards
Emmy the Great
Ella Eyre
George Ezra
Marianne Faithfull
Newton Faulkner
Lena Fiagbe
Kat Flint
Ryan Fletcher
Andi Fraggs
Barry Gibb
Maurice Gibb
David Gilmour
David Gray
Alistair Griffin
Malcolm Guite
Noel Gallagher
Mick Greenwood
Ed Harcourt
Nick Harper
Roy Harper
George Harrison
PJ Harvey
Justin Hayward
Imogen Heap
Paul Heaton
Ella Henderson
Ant Henson
Boo Hewerdine
Robyn Hitchcock
Trevor Horn
Ben Howard
HRVY
Jamelia
Bert Jansch
Sadie Jemmett
Elton John
Tom Jones
Wizz Jones
Martyn Joseph
Nik Kershaw
Wilson T. King
Beverley Knight
Steve Knightley
Charlie Landsborough
John Lennon
Adam Leonard
Al Lewis
Leona Lewis
Cher Lloyd
John Lodge
Jez Lowe
Nick Lowe

M–Z
 
Ewan MacColl
Kirsty MacColl
Amy Macdonald
Emily Maguire
Zayn Malik
Laura Marling
Johnny Marr
Michael Marra
Steve Marriott
John Martyn
Brian May
Conor Maynard
Paul McCartney
Shelagh McDonald
Charlie McDonnell
Rory McLeod
Tom McRae
Ralph McTell
Mika
Gary Moore
James Morrison
Morrissey
Alexi Murdoch
Graham Nash
Nina Nesbitt
Anthony Newley
John Newman
Sheila Nicholls
Heather Nova
Ivor Novello
Gilbert O'Sullivan
Tom Odell
Beth Orton
Ozzy Osbourne
Mark Owen
Nerina Pallot
Alex Parks
Passenger
Liam Payne
Mike Pinder
Leigh-Anne Pinnock
Karen Poole
Shelly Poole
Mal Pope
Paul Poulton
Brian Protheroe
Camille Purcell
Gerry Rafferty
Ricky Ross
Kate Rusby
Emeli Sandé
Polly Scattergood
Jay Sean
Ed Sheeran
Labi Siffre
Lucie Silvas
Robert Smith
Sam Smith
David Sneddon
Yusuf Islam (formerly Cat Stevens)
Al Stewart
Joe Strummer
Harry Styles
Dave Swarbrick
Roger Taylor
Jade Thirlwall
Sandi Thom
Ray Thomas
Raye
Richard Thompson
Teddy Thompson
Tanita Tikaram
Steve Tilston
Louis Tomlinson
KT Tunstall
Frank Turner
Bonnie Tyler
Bailey Tzuke
Judie Tzuke
Karl Wallinger
Clifford T. Ward
Shayne Ward
Roger Waters
Helen Watson
Robbie Williams
Robin Williamson
Amy Winehouse
Robert Wyatt
Pete Wylie
Sami Yusuf

United States

A–B

David Ackles
Ryan Adams
Trace Adkins
Julien Aklei
Steve Albini
Jason Aldean
Deborah Allen
Terry Allen
GG Allin
Mose Allison
Gregg Allman
Peter Alsop
Tori Amos
Anastacia
Eric Anders
Eric Andersen
Keith Anderson
Laurie Anderson
Theresa Andersson
Jill Andrews
Brooke Annibale
Fiona Apple
Joseph Arthur
Ashanti
Ashe
Rodney Atkins
Patti Austin
Gene Autry
Hoyt Axton
Aubrey Ayala
Dan Avidan
Steve Azar
Erykah Badu
Joan Baez
David M. Bailey
Julien Baker
Devendra Banhart
Sara Bareilles
Geoff Bartley
Steve Baxter
David Bazan
Beck
Drake Bell
Rita Bell
Vince Bell
Giselle Bellas
Alec Benjamin
Samm Bennett
Dierks Bentley
Matraca Berg
Dan Bern
Beyoncé
Jim Bianco
Eric Bibb
Diane Birch
Andrew Bird
Tony Bird
Alyse Black
Clint Black
Frank Black
Terry Blade
Janet Blair
Norman Blake
David Blue
Hugh Blumenfeld
Suzy Bogguss
Gordon Bok
Michael Bowers
Crystal Bowersox
Ralston Bowles
Soulja Boy
Michelle Branch
Jesse Brand
Chuck Brodsky
David Bromberg
Holly Brook
Jonatha Brooke
Garth Brooks
Chris Brown
Greg Brown
Jackson Browne
Peabo Bryson
Jeff Buckley
Tim Buckley
T-Bone Burnett
Jonathan Byrd

C–D

Colbie Caillat
J.J. Cale
Andrew Calhoun
Terry Callier
Glen Campbell
Kate Campbell
Laura Cantrell
Mariah Carey
Brandi Carlile
Hayes Carll
Vanessa Carlton
Craig Carothers
Mary Chapin Carpenter
Adam Carroll
Dee Carstensen
Dave Carter
June Carter
Neko Case
Peter Case
Johnny Cash
Rosanne Cash
Harry Chapin
Beth Nielsen Chapman
Tracy Chapman
Vic Chesnutt
Frank Christian
Lou Christie
Eric Church
Ciara
Annie Clark
Gene Clark
Kelly Clarkson
Guy Clark
Slaid Cleaves
Anita Cochran
Marc Cohn
Paula Cole
Judy Collins
Lui Collins
Shawn Colvin
Harry Connick Jr.
Connie Converse
David Cook
Sam Cooke
Alice Cooper
Chris Cornell
Matt Costa
Elizabeth Cotten
Ingrid Croce
Jim Croce
Dash Crofts
David Crosby
Christopher Cross
Mike Cross
Sheryl Crow
Rodney Crowell
Bobbie Cryner
Catie Curtis
Chelsea Cutler
Billy Ray Cyrus
Miley Cyrus
Noah Cyrus
Vernon Dalhart
Sean Danielsen
Glenn Danzig
Gail Davies
Kimya Dawson
Grey DeLisle
Kris Delmhorst
Lana Del Rey
Rebekah Del Rio
Iris DeMent
Jason Derulo
John Denver
Neil Diamond
Ani DiFranco
Maria D'Luz
Mike Doughty
Gregory Douglass
Connie Dover
The-Dream
Marshall Drew
DW (Dave) Drouillard
Bob Dylan
Jakob Dylan

E–G

Kate Earl
Stacey Earle
Justin Townes Earle
Steve Earle
Kenneth "Babyface" Edmonds
Jonathan Edwards
Billie Eilish
Mark Erelli
Alejandro Escovedo
Carmen Espinoza-Rodriquez
Melissa Etheridge
Richard Fariña
Melissa Ferrick
Roberta Flack
Dan Fogelberg
John Fogerty
Ben Folds
Keith Follesé
Steve Forbert
Jon Foreman
Ruthie Foster
Jeffrey Foucault
Michael Fracasso
Black Francis
Jackson C. Frank
Bob Franke
Carole Fredericks
Glenn Frey
Dean Friedman
Lefty Frizzell
Lady Gaga
Ken Gaines
Noel Gallagher
Annie Gallup
Timothy Garon
Mary Gauthier
Marvin Gaye
Teddy Geiger
Natalie Gelman
Daughn Gibson
Vance Gilbert
Vince Gill
Dominique Gizelle
Lotti Golden
Gabrielle Goodman
Steve Goodman
Lesley Gore
John Gorka
Nick Granato
Jackie Greene
Patty Griffin
Nanci Griffith
Jenn Grinels
Arlo Guthrie
Sarah Lee Guthrie
Woody Guthrie
Gwendolyn

H–J

Merle Haggard
Tom T. Hall
Halsey
Kristy Hanson
Tim Hardin
Jack Hardy
Ben Harper
Ciara Harris
Emmylou Harris
Jesse Harris
Debbie Harry
Beth Hart
John Hartford
Juliana Hatfield
Richie Havens
Ted Hawkins
Hunter Hayes
Jimi Hendrix
Arin Hanson
Terri Hendrix
Don Henley
Caroline Herring
Ari Hest
James Hetfield
John Hiatt
Sara Hickman
Lauryn Hill
Chris Hillman
Anne Hills
Keri Hilson
Tyler Hilton
Tish Hinojosa
Will Hoge
Malcolm Holcombe
J. Holiday
Cisco Houston
Bob Howard
Grayson Hugh
Tim Hughes
Sierra Hull
Meg Hutchinson
Walter Hyatt
Janis Ian
India.Arie
James Ingram
David Ippolito
Allison Iraheta
Iron & Wine
Chris Isaak
Gregory Alan Isakov
Bon Iver
Carl Jackson
Janet Jackson
Jermaine Jackson
Michael Jackson
Avi Jacob
Nicky Jam
Brendan James
Sarah Jarosz
Jaymay
Nikki Jean
Stephan Jenkins
Mason Jennings
Waylon Jennings
Molly Jenson
Justin Jesso
Jewel
Eilen Jewell
Kari Jobe
Billy Joel
Jack Johnson
Jamey Johnson
Freedy Johnston
Joshua Scott Jones
Norah Jones
Sharon Jones
Montell Jordan
Simon Joyner
Gary Jules
Tyler Joseph

K–L

Si Kahn
Kieran Kane
Lucy Kaplansky
Kashif
Mat Kearney
Robert Earl Keen
Marianne Keith
Toby Keith
Kelis
Malcolm David Kelley
Ruston Kelly
R. Kelly
Tori Kelly
Alicia Keys
Monica Kim
Carole King
Charles E. King
Claude King
Elle King
Sonya Kitchell
Charles Michael Kittridge
Hayley Kiyoko
"Spider" John Koerner
Matthew Koma
Nikhil Korula
Mark Kozelek
Alison Krauss
Kris Kristofferson
Lenny Kravitz
Ben Kweller
Jimmy LaFave
Miranda Lambert
Ray LaMontagne
Justin Lanning
Patty Larkin
Jim Lauderdale
Lauv
Christine Lavin
Scott Law
Lead Belly
Amos Lee
Amy Lee
Tom Lehrer
Bethany Joy Lenz
David Levin
Blake Lewis
Bob Lind
Lisa Loeb
Kenny Loggins
Demi Lovato
Laura Love
Karen Lovely
Lyle Lovett
Lera Lynn
Lazer Lloyd

M–N

Rod MacDonald
Dougie MacLean
Bill Madden
Martie Maguire
Taj Mahal
Sananda Maitreya
David Mallett
Michelle Malone
Melissa Manchester
Barry Mann
AmberRose Marie
Teena Marie
Bruno Mars
Bob Martin
Melanie Martinez
Richard Marx
Dana Mase
Michael Masser
Kathy Mattea
Nanette Maxine
Heather Maxwell
John Mayer
Curtis Mayfield
Parker McCollum
Jennette McCurdy
Country Joe McDonald
Reba McEntire
Tim McGraw
Roger McGuinn
Nellie McKay
Bonnie McKee
Lori McKenna
Erin McKeown
Rod McKuen
Don McLean
James McMurtry 
Melanie
Bridgit Mendler
Idina Menzel
Michael J. Merenda, Jr.
Tift Merritt
Pia Mia
Julia Michaels
Ingrid Michaelson
Bea Miller
Julie Miller
Lin-Manuel Miranda
Jim Messina
Anaïs Mitchell
Keb' Mo'
Moby
Janelle Monáe
Ben Moody
Mandy Moore
Allison Moorer
Gurf Morlix
Bill Morrissey
Jason Mraz
Shawn Mullins
Peter Mulvey
Jimmy Murphy
Michael Martin Murphey
Kacey Musgraves
Anna Nalick
Graham Nash
Leigh Nash
Nina Nastasia
Matt Nathanson
Holly Near
Fred Neil
Willie Nelson
 Ricky Nelson
Jennifer Nettles
Mickey Newbury
Carrie Newcomer
Randy Newman
Joanna Newsom
Stevie Nicks
Britt Nicole
Willie Nile
Harry Nilsson
Keri Noble
Noname
The Notorious B.I.G.
Bradley Nowell
Laura Nyro

O–R

Conor Oberst
Olivia O'Brien
Tim O'Brien
Phil Ochs
Finneas O'Connell
Aoife O'Donovan
Will Oldham
Tony Oller
David Olney
Johnny Otis
Faith Page
Jim Page
Brad Paisley
Dolly Parton
Ellis Paul
Tom Paxton
Johnny Paycheck
Herb Pedersen
Sarah Pedinotti
Yolanda Pérez
Katy Perry
Pierce Pettis
Madeleine Peyroux
Liz Phair
Kelly Joe Phelps
Grant-Lee Phillips
Sam Phillips
Shawn Phillips
Utah Phillips
Rod Picott
Pitbull
Gene Pitney
Doc Pomus
Cassadee Pope
Catherine Porter
Willy Porter
Mike Posner
Grace Potter
Elvis Presley
Tristan Prettyman
Dory Previn
Toni Price
Prince
John Prine
Chuck Prophet
Charlie Puth
Top Quality
Joshua Radin
Bonnie Raitt
Tony Ramey
Willis Alan Ramsey
Carmino Ravosa
Otis Redding
Ann Reed
Lou Reed
Bebe Rexha
Trent Reznor
Kim Richey
Jonathan Richman
Amy Rigby
Rihanna
Josh Ritter
JT Roach
Carson Robison
Zack de la Rocha
Jimmie Rodgers
Olivia Rodrigo
Henry Rollins
Dräco Rosa
Raina Rose
Emmy Rossum
Josh Rouse
David Rovics
Peter Rowan
Darius Rucker
Todd Rundgren
Tom Rush
Tom Russell

S–T

Rachael Sage
Doug Sahm
Richie Sambora
Martha Scanlan
Marc Scibilia
Darrell Scott
Dan Seals
Jim Seals
John Sebastian
Pebe Sebert
Neil Sedaka
Pete Seeger
Martin Sexton
Tupac Shakur
Maia Sharp
Billy Joe Shaver
Jules Shear
Duncan Sheik
Blake Shelton
Vonda Shepard
Richard Shindell
Michelle Shocked
Paul Siebel
Paul Simon
Nina Simone
Matt Simons
Sisqó
Ricky Skaggs
Patrick Sky
Megan Slankard
P. F. Sloan
Sasha Alex Sloan
Darden Smith
Elliott Smith
Michael Smith
Patti Smith
Willow Smith
Chris Smither
Todd Snider
Phoebe Snow
Jill Sobule
Ben Sollee
Trey Songz
Jo-El Sonnier
Soraya
Regina Spektor
Aaron Sprinkle
Bill Staines
Chris Stapleton
David Steinhart
Colin Stetson
Sufjan Stevens
John Stewart
Wynn Stewart
Stephen Stills
Maria Straub
Marty Stuart
Patrick Stump
Alison Sudol
Gene Summers
Taylor Swift
Raven-Symoné
SZA
Corey Taylor
Eric Taylor
James Taylor
Livingston Taylor
Louise Taylor
Ryan Tedder
Jack Tempchin
Chloe Temtchine
Vienna Teng
Chris Thile
Robin Thicke
Bryson Tiller
Justin Timberlake
Rob Thomas
Chris Tomlin
Meghan Trainor
Alex Turner
Shania Twain
Steven Tyler

U–Z

Usher
Grace VanderWaal
Guy Van Duser
Dave Van Ronk
Townes Van Zandt
Phil Vassar
Vassy
Stoll Vaughan
Suzanne Vega
Laura Veirs
Justin Vernon
John Vesely
Jack Vidgen
Rhonda Vincent
Eric Von Schmidt
Rocky Votolato
Loudon Wainwright III
Sloan Wainwright
Tom Waits
Butch Walker
Jerry Jeff Walker
Summer Walker
M. Ward
Linda Waterfall
Doc Watson
Lil Wayne
Gillian Welch
Kevin Welch
Susan Werner
Matt Wertz
Tierra Whack
Cheryl Wheeler
Erica Wheeler
Brooke White
Jack White
Josh White
Maurice White
Chris Whitley
David Wilcox
Brooks Williams
Dar Williams
Don Williams
Geoffrey Williams
Hank Williams
Hank Williams Jr.
Keller Williams
Lucinda Williams
Pharrell Williams
Victoria Williams
Cris Williamson
Gretchen Wilson
Jesse Winchester
Cody Wise
Bill Withers
Denison Witmer
Jim Wolf
Kate Wolf
Bobby Womack
Bill Wurtz
Juliet Wyers
Rachael Yamagata
Dwight Yoakam
Jesse Colin Young
Neil Young
Steve Young
Frank Zappa
Mirah Yom Tov Zeitlyn
Steven Zelin
Warren Zevon
Jeremy Zucker
Natalia Zukerman

Venezuela

Mirla Castellanos
Ilan Chester
Guillermo Dávila
Ricardo Montaner
Jose Luis Rodriguez
Aldemaro Romero
Franco De Vita

Others who both write songs and sing
Following are performers who are not singer-songwriters in the traditional sense, but who both write and perform songs in other genres.  This includes artists known more prominently as members of bands and not primarily as soloists.

Australia

Tina Arena
Sia
Iggy Azalea
John Butler
Kasey Chambers
Michael Hutchence
Daniel Johns
Jessica Mauboy
Anne McCue
Kylie Minogue
Bon Scott
Guy Sebastian
Cody Simpson
Rob Swire
Angus and Julia Stone

Bosnia And Herzegovina
Dino Merlin

Canada

Bryan Adams
Melissa Auf der Maur
Justin Bieber
Matthew Good
Alexz Johnson
Daniel Lanois
James LaBrie
Geddy Lee
Gordon Lightfoot
Shawn Mendes
Alanis Morissette
Alannah Myles
Carl Newman
Aldo Nova
Robbie Robertson
Buffy Sainte-Marie
Skye Sweetnam
David Usher
Neil Young
Alessia Cara

Chile
Tom Araya

Croatia

Darko Rundek
Zlatan Stipišić Gibonni
Branimir Štulić

China

Zhang Yixing

Denmark

 Alberte
 Sys Bjerre
 Maggie Björklund
 Burhan G
 Erika de Casier
 Tim Christensen
 Coco O.
 Anna David
 Dicte
 Aura Dione
 Fallulah
 Lukas Forchhammer
 Emmelie de Forest
 Troels Gustavsen
 Hugo Helmig
 Thomas Helmig
 Caroline Henderson
 Hjalmar
 Thomas Holm
 Lars H.U.G.
 Karen Jønsson
 King Diamond
 Jeppe Laursen
 Sebastian Lind
 Kwamie Liv
 Simon Kvamm
 Medina
 Joey Moe
 Myrkur
 MØ
 Oh Land
 Agnes Obel
 Jascha Richter
 Pernille Rosendahl
 Natasja Saad
 Søren Sko
 Kira Skov
 Mike Tramp
 Sune Rose Wagner
 Rasmus Walter
 Tue West
 Karl William
 Xander

Finland

 Jouni Hynynen
 Jyrki 69
 Andy McCoy
 Timo Rautiainen
 Gösta Sundqvist
 Timo Tolkki
 Ville Valo
 Toni Wirtanen
 Lauri Ylonen

France

 Bernard Bonvoisin
 Étienne Daho
 Zazie

Germany

Udo Dirkschneider
Max Koffler
Klaus Meine

Hong Kong
George Lam

Iceland
Bjork

India

Babbu Maan
A. R. Rahman

Ireland

Bono
Enya
Órla Fallon
Lynn Hilary
Niall Horan

Italy 

 Stefano Righi
 Zucchero

Japan

Aimer
Mao Abe
Aiko
Angela Aki
Yūko Andō
Chara
Cocco
CooRie
Joe Inoue
Kurumi Enomoto
Masaharu Fukuyama
Gackt
Ayumi Hamasaki
Motohiro Hata
Megumi Hinata
Ken Hirai
Mayumi Horikawa
Hyde
Leo Ieiri
Mari Iijima
Koshi Inaba
Yōsui Inoue
Shigeru Izumiya
Ai Kawashima
Hiroshi Kitadani
Kokia
Kotringo
Koda Kumi
Mai Kuraki
Keisuke Kuwata
Masato Hayakawa
Olivia Lufkin
Noriyuki Makihara
Yumi Matsutoya
Miwa
Yui Mizuno
Showtaro Morikubo
Miyuki Nakajima
Yuto Nakajima
Uri Nakayama
Haru Nemuri
Sakurako Ohara
Tamio Okuda
Chihiro Onitsuka
Ai Otsuka
Yuki Saito
Maaya Sakamoto
Jun Shibata
Ringo Shiina
Akiko Shikata
SoulJa
Shikao Suga
Yuya Takaki
Yukihide Takekawa
Mariya Takeuchi
Hikaru Utada
Hitomi Yaida
Etsuko Yakushimaru
Maria Yamamoto
Tatsuro Yamashita
Takuro Yoshida
Yui

Malaysia

Yuna

New Zealand

Liam Finn
Neil Finn
Tim Finn
Lorde
Jamie McDell
Bic Runga
Hollie Smith
Stan Walker
Hayley Westenra

Nigeria

Muma Gee
Niyola
Waje

Pakistan

Ali Baba Khan
Bilal Saeed
Salman Ahmad
Ali Azmat
Zeek Afridi
Humaira Arshad
Nadia Ali
Atif Aslam
Iqbal Bano
Sara Haider
Komal Rizvi
Haroon
Mehdi Hassan
Ahmed Jahanzeb
Ustad Nusrat Fateh Ali Khan
Ali Zafar

Philippines

Dong Abay
Freddie Aguilar
Ogie Alcasid
Cynthia Alexander
Barbie Almalbis
Joey Ayala
Christian Bautista
Rico Blanco
Ely Buendia
Jose Mari Chan
Charice (Jake Zyrus)
Yeng Constantino
Billy Joe Crawford
Sharon Cuneta
Jay Durias
Eraserheads
Pops Fernandez
Sarah Geronimo
Janno Gibbs
Rachelle Ann Go
Kyla
Bamboo Mañalac
Maine Mendoza
Chito Miranda
Morissette
Kitchie Nadal
Martin Nievera
Nina
Kylie Padilla
Gary Valenciano
Princess Velasco
Regine Velasquez
Yael Yuzon

Romania
 Alexandra Stan

Serbia

Momčilo Bajagić
Đorđe Balašević
Zvonko Bogdan
Dejan Cukić
Nikola Čuturilo
Vlada Divljan
Bebi Dol
Bora Đorđević
Zvonimir Đukić Đule
Bane Krstić
Kiki Lesendrić
Srđan Marjanović
Slađana Milošević
Milan Mladenović
Ljuba Ninković
Madame Piano
Ana Popović
Toma Zdravković
Predrag Živković Tozovac

Singapore

 Tanya Chua
 JJ Lin
 Stefanie Sun

South Africa

 Cristina Boshoff
 Don Clarke
 Johnny Clegg
 Anton Goosen
 David Kramer
 Shekhinah (singer)
 Tellaman
 Karen Zoid

South Korea

 Ailee
 Bang Yongguk
 BoA
 Cho Yong-pil
 Im Chang-jung
 Jun Jinyoung
 Jung Yonghwa
 Kang Seungyoon
 Bang Chan 
 Kangta
 Kim C
 Kim Dong-ryool
 Moon Hee-jun
 Kim Jong-seo
 Kim Kwang-Seok
 Kim Jaejoong
 Kim Junsu
 Kim Sa-rang
 Lee Jonghyun
 Lee Juck 
 MC Sniper
 The One
 Park Hyo-shin
 Rain
 Seo Taiji
 Shin Hae Chul
 Shin Seung Hun
 Tablo
 Wheesung
 Park Yeeun
 Yoon Jong-shin
 Yoo Hee-Yeol
RM (rapper)
Jin
Suga
J-Hope
Jimin
V
Jungkook
G-Dragon
T.O.P
Young K
Jae Park
JB (South Korean Singer)
B.I (rapper)
Bobby (rapper)
Zico (rapper)
Jeon So-yeon
Hui (singer)
Bumzu
Kang Seung-yoon
Mino (rapper)
Park Kyung
LE (rapper)
Chaeyoung
Elkie Chong
Lee Tae-yong
Mark Lee (singer)
Na Jaemin
Onew
Kim Jong-hyun (singer)
Key (entertainer)
Choi Min-ho
Lee Tae-min
Joohoney
Wonho (singer)
Solar (singer)
Moonbyul
Wheein
Hwasa
Chungha
Park Jin-young
Jessi (musician)
PSY
IU (singer)
Eric Nam
Chanyeol
Suho
Baekhyun
Chen (singer)
Sehun (singer)
Taecyeon
Jun.K
Wooyoung
Nichkhun
Lee Jun-ho (singer)
Chansung
Amber Liu (singer)
Dami Im
Hyuna
Henry Lau (singer)

Sweden

Agnetha Fältskog
Caroline Hjelt
Aino Jawo
Tove Lo

Taiwan

 Chang Yu-sheng
 Chang Chen-yue
 Lala Hsu
 Eve Ai
 Enno Cheng
 Cheer Chen
 David Tao
 Evan Yo
 A-Lin
 Jay Chou
 Kenji Wu
 Deserts Chang
 Chih Siou
 Ella Chen
 Hebe Tien
 Selina Jen
 Leehom Wang
 Jolin Tsai
 Crowd Lu
 Tank
 Will Pan
 Wu Tsing-fong
 MC HotDog
 Yoga Lin
 Vivian Hsu
 Sun Sheng Xi
 Lo Ta-yu
 Phil Chang
 Ashin
 OSN
 Gary Chaw
 ØZI
 Nick Chou
 Eric Chou

Turkey

 Sezen Aksu
 Mazhar Alanson
 Kenan Doğulu
 Orhan Gencebay
 İlhan İrem
 Kayahan
 Barış Manço
 Bülent Ortaçgil
 Nazan Öncel
 Münir Nurettin Selçuk
 Tarkan
 Yıldız Tilbe

Ukraine
 Natalie Gioia

United Kingdom

A–L

 Sade Adu
 Damon Albarn
 Marc Almond
 Ian Anderson
 Jon Anderson
 Badly Drawn Boy (Damon Gough)
 Gary Barlow
 Syd Barrett
 Julian Barry
 Blaze Bayley
 Natasha Bedingfield
 Nick Beggs
 Adrian Belew
 Amelle Berrabah
 James Blunt
 Betty Boo
 David Bowie
 Sarah Brightman
 Keisha Buchanan
 Mutya Buena
 Jake Bugg
 Kate Bush
 Biff Byford
 Katy Carr
 Eric Clapton
 Phil Collins
 Tulisa Contostavlos
 Elvis Costello
 David Coverdale
 Charli XCX
 Charlotte Gordon Cumming
 Dappy
 Ray Davies
 Cathy Dennis
 Marina Lambrini Diamandis
 Paul Di'Anno
 Bruce Dickinson
 Pete Doherty
 Donovan
 Stephen Duffy
 Joe Elliott
 Marianne Faithfull
 Peter Gabriel
 Liam Gallagher
 Noel Gallagher
 Barry Gibb
 Maurice Gibb
 Robin Gibb
 Ian Gillan
 David Gilmour
 Gary Glitter
 Ellie Goulding
 David Gray
 Gregory Gray
 Matt Hales
 Rob Halford
 Pete Ham
 Peter Hammill
 Calvin Harris
 George Harrison
 Justin Hawkins
 Justin Hayward
 Imogen Heap
 Mick Hucknall
 Ian Hunter
 Jessie J
 Joe Jackson
 Mick Jagger
 Jem
 Elton John
 Brian Johnson
 Matt Johnson
 Mick Jones
 Nik Kershaw
 Jim King
 David Knopfler
 Mark Knopfler
 Greg Lake
 Simon Le Bon
 Lemmy
 John Lennon
 Leona Lewis
 Gary Lightbody
 Limahl
 Dua Lipa
 Cher Lloyd
 Nick Lowe
 Jeff Lynne

M–Z

 Paddy McAloon
 Paul McCartney
 Christine McVie
 Shirley Manson
 Zayn Malik
 Steve Marriott
 Brian May
 Freddie Mercury
 George Michael
 Morrissey
 Kate Nash
 Simon Neil
 John Newman
 Jim Noir
 Richard O'Brien
 Rita Ora
 John Otway
 Bill Owen
 Mark Owen
 Ozzy Osbourne
 John Payne
 Liam Payne
 Robert Plant
 Plunkett
 Heidi Range
 Keith Relf
 Tim Rice
 Keith Richards
 Gavin Rossdale
 Graham Russell
 Emeli Sandé
 Sam Smith
 Ringo Starr
 Al Stewart
 Rod Stewart
 Sting
 Joss Stone
 Joe Strummer
 Harry Styles
 Jeremy Taylor
 Roger Taylor
 David Tibet
 Louis Tomlinson
 Alex Turner
 Tom Vek
 Roger Waters
 Florence Welch
 Paul Weller
 John Wetton
 Kim Wilde
 Roy Wood
 Richard Wright
 Thom Yorke
 Will Young

United States

A–E

50 Cent
Ryan Adams
Christina Aguilera
Priscilla Ahn
Ray Alder
Nadia Ali
Gregg Allman
Dave Alvin
Trey Anastasio
Ken Andrews
Michael Andrews
John Arch
David Archuleta
Billie Joe Armstrong
Louis Armstrong
Dan Auerbach
Gene Autry
Francesca Battistelli
Beck
Walter Becker
Joey Belladonna
Chuck Berry
Dickey Betts
Beyoncé
Larry Blackmon
Karl Blau
Michael Bolton
Jon Bon Jovi
Olivia Bonilla
Ralston Bowles
Brandon Boyd
Garth Brooks
Jackson Browne
Peabo Bryson
Lindsey Buckingham
Benjamin Burnley
Glen Burtnik
John Bush
Paul Butterfield
Sarah Buxton
David Byrne
Ryan Cabrera
Jerry Cantrell
Mariah Carey
Eric Carmen
Chris Carrabba
Peter Cetera
Bill Champlin
Tracy Chapman
Cher
Gary Cherone
Peter Cincotti
Guy Clark
Kelly Clarkson
Roger Clyne
Kurt Cobain
Fred Cole
Lisa Coleman
Billy Corgan
Chris Cornell
Jonathan Coulton
Dash Crofts
Robert Cray
Peter Criss
Kevin Cronin
David Crosby
Sheryl Crow
Rivers Cuomo
John Curulewski
Miley Cyrus
Terence Trent D'Arby
Jonathan Davis
Howie Day
Tom DeLonge
John Denver
Dennis DeYoung
Neil Diamond
Bo Diddley
Ronnie James Dio
Dion DiMucci
Willie Dixon
Don Dokken
David Draiman
Haylie Duff
Hilary Duff
Sean Duffy
Fred Durst
Bob Dylan
Jakob Dylan
Danny Elfman
Eminem
Ace Enders
Gloria Estefan

F–K

Donald Fagen
Don Felder
Fergie
William Fitzsimmons
John Flansburgh
Brandon Flowers
John Fogerty
Dan Fogleberg
Ben Folds
Ace Frehley
Glenn Frey
John Frusciante
Vic Fuentes
Becky G
Lady Gaga
David Gates
Gloria Gaynor
Barry Gibb
Maurice Gibb
Robin Gibb
Benjamin Gibbard
Billy Gibbons
Eliza Gilkyson
Selena Gomez
Ariana Grande
Hank Green
Jeremy Gregory
Christina Grimmie
Dave Grohl
Buddy Guy
Sammy Hagar
Daryl Hall
Jessica Harp
Ben Harper
Mary Harris
Deborah Harry
Dan Hartman
Sophie B. Hawkins
Angel Haze
Mark Heard
Levon Helm
Logan Henderson
Jimi Hendrix
Don Henley
James Hetfield
Buddy Holly
Mark Hoppus
Robert Hunter
James Ingram
Alan Jackson
Janet Jackson
Michael Jackson
Jay-Z
Stephan Jenkins
Robert Johnson
JoJo
Joe Jonas
Kevin Jonas
Nick Jonas
Rickie Lee Jones
Janis Joplin
Tyler Joseph
Maynard James Keenan
R. Kelly
Mean Gene Kelton
Eddie Kendricks
Kenna
Doug Kershaw
Kesha
Alicia Keys
Thurane Aung Khin
Anthony Kiedis
Bobby Kimball
B.B. King

L–N

 Adam Lambert
 Ray LaMontagne
 Mark Lanegan
 Cyndi Lauper
 Bernie Leadon
 Bethany Joy Lenz
 Jared Leto
 Adam Levine
 Aaron Lewis
 Philip Lindholm
 John Linnell
 Lisa Loeb
 Kenny Loggins
 Lindsay Lohan
 Joe Lopez
 Demi Lovato
 Courtney Love
 Lyle Lovett
 Ross Lynch
 Loretta Lynn
 Benji Madden
 Joel Madden
 Madonna
 Kaitlyn Maher
 Jeff Mangum
 Barry Manilow
 Aimee Mann
 Marilyn Manson
 Marce
 Anthony Marinelli
 Chan Marshall
 Richard Marx
 James Maslow
 Dave Matthews
 John Mayer
 Edwin McCain
 Jesse McCartney
 Michael McDonald
 Jon McLaughlin
 Katharine McPhee
 Travis Meeks
 Randy Meisner
 John Mellencamp
 Wendy Melvoin
 Natalie Merchant
 Stephin Merritt
 AJ Michalka
 Aly Michalka
 Rhett Miller
 Roger Miller
 Steve Miller
 Nicki Minaj
 Freddy Moore
 Jim Morrison
 Chuck Mosley
 Elliott Murphy
 Dave Mustaine
 Frank J. Myers
 Faheem Najm
 Nelly
 Dan Nelson
 Michael Nesmith
 Mike Ness
 Randy Newman
 Ne-Yo
 Stevie Nicks
 Keri Noble
 The Notorious B.I.G.
 Justin Nozuka
 Ted Nugent

O–Z

John Oates
Ric Ocasek
Roy Orbison
Joan Osborne
Buck Owens
David Paich
Mike Patton
Carlos Pena, Jr.
CeCe Peniston
Christina Perri
Katy Perry
Linda Perry
Steve Perry
Tom Petty
Glen Phillips
Pink
Dave Pirner
Rachel Platten
Jimmy Pop
John Popper
Poppy
Grace Potter
Prince
John Prine
Chuck Prophet
Eddie Rabbitt
Rakim
Twiggy Ramirez
Redfoo
Haley Reinhart
Bebe Rexha
Trent Reznor
Lionel Richie
Johnny Rivers
Smokey Robinson
Zack de la Rocha
Sixto Rodriguez
Kenny Rogers
Ed Roland
Axl Rose
David Lee Roth
Todd Rundgren
Leon Russell
John Rzeznik
Kendall Schmidt
Timothy B. Schmit
Big Sean
Drew Seeley
Bob Seger
Selena
Adam Selzer
Tommy Shaw
Adam Shearer
Duncan Sheik
Shwayze
Gene Simmons
Paul Simon
Ashlee Simpson
Helen Slater
Kathy Sledge
Michael W. Smith
Dee Snider
J.D. Souther
Britney Spears
Bruce Springsteen
Layne Staley
James Lee Stanley
Paul Stanley
Scott Stapp
Jeffree Star
Gwen Stefani
Stephen Stills
Barbra Streisand
Bruce Sudano
Rebecca Sugar
Donna Summer
Gene Summers
Matthew Sweet
Michael Sweet
Taylor Swift
James Taylor
Courtney Taylor-Taylor
Rob Thomas
Justin Timberlake
Ashley Tisdale
Mark Tornillo
Meghan Trainor
Roger Troutman
Joe Lynn Turner
Jeff Tweedy
Conway Twitty
Steven Tyler
Carrie Underwood
Dave Van Ronk
Eddie Vedder
Kate Voegele
Tom Waits
Joe Walsh
Crystal Waters
Kanye West
Paul Westerberg
Brooke White
Jack White
Maurice White
will.i.am
Hayley Williams
Joseph Williams
Paul Williams
Ann Wilson
Brian Wilson
Nancy Wilson
Kip Winger
Stevie Wonder
"Weird Al" Yankovic
Doug Yoel
James Young
Steven Van Zandt
Donnie Van Zant
Johnny Van Zant
Ronnie Van Zant
Frank Zappa
Zendaya
Rob Zombie

Uruguay
Pablo Sciuto

Venezuela

Ilan Chester
Guillermo Dávila
Aldemaro Romero
Franco De Vita

Vietnam
Sơn Tùng M-TP

Wales 

 Michael Jones
 Matthew Tuck

See also

 Lists of musicians

Singer-songwriters
List of singer-songwriters